Eszter Dara (born May 30, 1990 in Budapest, Hungary) is a female Hungarian swimmer, who competed for her  country at the 2008 and 2012 Summer Olympics.

She won a bronze medal at the 2008 European Short Course Swimming Championships in 100 m butterfly. At the Summer Olympics she came 6th in 4×200 m freestyle relay.

In 2010 at the European Championships held in her hometown, Budapest she came fourth in the 4×100 m freestyle and became European champion as part of the 4×200 m freestyle relay team.

References

1990 births
Living people
Hungarian female freestyle swimmers
Hungarian female butterfly swimmers
Olympic swimmers of Hungary
Swimmers at the 2008 Summer Olympics
Swimmers at the 2012 Summer Olympics
Swimmers from Budapest
European Aquatics Championships medalists in swimming
20th-century Hungarian women
21st-century Hungarian women